Angel Granchov (Bulgarian: Ангел Грънчов; born 16 October 1992) is a Bulgarian footballer who plays as a defender for CSKA 1948 II.

Club career

CSKA Sofia
Born in Elin Pelin, Granchov joined the CSKA Sofia Academy in 2002 at the age of ten.
He made his first team debut on 4 March 2012 in a 2–0 A PFG loss against Chernomorets Burgas. His first goal came in his second appearance, a header from a corner in a 3–1 home win  against Kaliakra Kavarna on 11 March. Granchov retained his starting spot until the end of the season, but received a red card on one occasion - in the 0–1 away loss against Ludogorets Razgrad in a title-deciding match held on 23 May 2012. In January 2014, Granchov was released from his contract.

Lokomotiv Plovdiv
On 17 February 2014, Granchov signed a two-and-a-half-year contract with Lokomotiv Plovdiv.

Slavia Sofia
In late January 2015, Granchov was acquired by Slavia Sofia.

CSKA Sofia
In July 2015, Granchov returned to CSKA Sofia.

Stal Mielec
On 17 July 2017, Granchov signed with I liga side Stal Mielec.

International career
In May 2012, Granchov received his first call-up to the Bulgaria U21 team
for a 2013 UEFA European Under–21 Football Championship qualification match against Scotland U21. On 31 May 2012, Granchov made his debut after coming on as a second-half substitute in the 2–2 draw.

Statistics
As of 3 May 2016

Honours

Club
CSKA Sofia
 Bulgarian Cup: 2015–16

References

External links

1992 births
Living people
Association football defenders
Bulgarian footballers
Bulgaria youth international footballers
Bulgaria under-21 international footballers
PFC CSKA Sofia players
PFC Lokomotiv Plovdiv players
PFC Slavia Sofia players
Neftochimic Burgas players
Stal Mielec players
PFC Minyor Pernik players
KF Flamurtari players
Akademija Pandev players
FC Septemvri Sofia players
FC Maritsa Plovdiv players
First Professional Football League (Bulgaria) players
I liga players
Football Superleague of Kosovo players
Macedonian First Football League players
Bulgarian expatriate footballers
Bulgarian expatriate sportspeople in Poland
Bulgarian expatriate sportspeople in North Macedonia
Expatriate footballers in Poland
Expatriate footballers in Kosovo
Expatriate footballers in North Macedonia